This is a list of flag bearers who have represented Kuwait at the Olympics.

Flag bearers carry the national flag of their country at the opening ceremony of the Olympic Games.

See also
Kuwait at the Olympics

References

Kuwait at the Olympics
Kuwait
Olympic flagbearers
Olympic flagbearers